This is a list of transfers that took place during the 2009 Primera División of Chile season.

Apertura 2009

Audax Italiano
In
  Cristián Vilches from  Palestino
  Christian Martínez from  Universidad de Chile
  Fabián Benítez from  Cobreloa
  Franco Matías Quiroga from  Talleres de Córdoba
  Ricardinho from  Universidad San Martín de Porres
Out
  Miguel Ángel Romero to  Coquimbo Unido
  Braulio Leal to  Unión Española
  Juan González to  Universidad de Chile (end of loan)
  Manuel Ibarra to  Coquimbo Unido
  Mario Villasanti Released
  Marcelo Broli Released

Cobreloa
In
 Alejandro Osorio from  Ñublense
 Rodolfo Guillén from  12 de Octubre
 Sebastián Montecinos from  San Marcos de Arica
 Michael Silva from  Lobos BUAP
 Pablo Mannara from  Nueva Chicago
 Juan Carlos Caballero from  Benidorm CD
 Lucas Exequiel Gauna from  Nueva Chicago
 Leonardo Iorlano from  Club Almagro
 Ever Cantero from  Ñublense
Out
 Gustavo Savoia to  Ponte Preta
 Francisco Prieto to  Colo-Colo
 Rafael Celedón to  Municipal Iquique
 Daniel González to  Nautico (Returns to Colo-Colo)
 Fabián Benítez to  Audax Italiano
 Iván Guillauma to  Santiago Morning
 Luis Fuentes to  Coquimbo Unido

Cobresal
In
 Nicolás Canales from  Unión Española (loan)
 Marcelo Medina from  O'Higgins
 Jorge Lagunas from  Deportes Melipilla
 Angelo Alvarado from  Puerto Montt
 Hans Gómez from  O'Higgins
 José Miguel Rosales from  O'Higgins
 Carlos Alzamora from  La Serena
 Juan Cisternas from  Club Deportivo Ferroviario Almirante Arturo Fernández Vial
 Rony Pérez from  Cruz Azul Hidalgo
Out
 Diego Guidi to  La Serena
 Marco Olea to  Lobos de la BUAP
 Luis Godoy to  Unión La Calera
 Freddy Segura to  La Serena
 Fabián Alfaro to  Coquimbo Unido
 Rodrigo Núñez to  Antofagasta
 Pedro Emiliano Muñoz to  Curico Unido

Colo-Colo
In
 Rodrigo Riquelme from  Curicó Unido
 César Carranza from  Gimnasia y Esgrima de Jujuy
 Nelson Cabrera from  Cerro Porteño
 Francisco Prieto from  Cobreloa
 Yerson Opazo from  La Serena
 Gerardo Cortés from  Unión Española (loan return)
 Daniel González to  Cobreloa (loan return)
 Fernando Meneses to  O'Higgins (loan return)
 Boris Sagredo from  Palestino (loan return)
 Bruno Romo from  Santiago Wanderers (loan return)
 Rafael Caroca from  O'Higgins (loan return)
 Sebastián González from  Estudiantes Tecos
Out
 Rainer Wirth to  Municipal Iquique (loaned)
 Moises Villarroel to  Santiago Wanderers
 Jorge Carrasco to  Palestino (loaned)
 Daniel González to  Nautico (loaned)
 Cristobal Jorquera to  O'Higgins (loaned)
 Juan Gonzalo Lorca to  O'Higgins (loaned)
 Fernando Meneses to  O'Higgins (loaned)
 Bastián Arce to  Rangers (loaned)
 Ricardo Rojas to  Necaxa

Curicó Unido
In
 Ever Amarilla from  Unión Española
 Hector Barra from  Deportes Melipilla
 Johan Fuentes from  Unión Española
 Sebastián Páez from  Provincial Osorno
 Pedro Muñoz from  Cobresal (loan return)
 Mateo Martinelli from  Ben Hur
 Claudio Calderon from  Unión Española
 Cesar Diaz from  Deportes Melipilla
 Alberto Ortega from  Club Aurora
 Rodrigo Brito from  La Serena
 Sebastián Morquio from  CA Progreso
Out
 Rodrigo Riquelme to  Colo-Colo
 Luis Jara to  La Serena
 Victor Gonzalez to  San Marcos de Arica
 Jose Mardones to  Lota Schwager
 Johntahan Nuñez to  Rangers de Talca
 Bibencio Servin to  Club Fernando de la Mora

Everton
In
  Fernando Manriquez from  Santiago Morning
  Roberto Gutiérrez from  UAG Tecos
  Rodrigo Ramírez from  O'Higgins
  Diego Figueredo from  Cerro Porteño
  Nicolás Freitas from  CA Progreso
  Sebastián Penco from  Skoda Xanthi
  Nicolás Peric from  Genclerbirligi
  Oscar Roberto Cornejo from  Cobreloa
  José Luis Muñoz from  Magallanes
Out
  Mauricio Arias to  Universidad de Chile
  Paulo Garcés to  Universidad Católica
  Cristián Canío to  San Martín de Tucumán
  Sebastián Tagliabué to  La Serena
  Juan Luis González to  La Serena
  Ángel Rojas to  Universidad de Chile
  Jesús Toscanini to  Tacuarembó
  John Jairo Castillo to  Deportivo Pereira
  José Luis Cabión to  Santiago Morning

Huachipato
In
 Luis Ignacio Quinteros from  Club León
 Edgardo Abdala from  Ñublense
 Carlos Espinoza from  Puerto Montt
 José Luis Zelaye from  Palestino
 Adrian Vilchez from  Unión Española

Out
 Mauricio Zenteno to  Universidad Católica (loan return)
 Henry Lapczyk to  Sportivo Luqueño
 Miguel Aceval to  Unión Española
 Roberto Cartes to  Tampico Madero
 José Carlos Burgos to  Deportes Concepción
 Hernán Madrid to  Unión La Calera

La Serena
In:
 Luis Jara from  Curicó Unido
 Sebastián Tagliabué from  Everton
 Jorge Schwager from  Puerto Montt
 Patricio Rubina from  Universidad de Concepción
 Freddy Segura from  Cobresal
 Juan Luis González from  Everton
 Diego Guidi from  Cobresal

Out:
 Yerson Opazo to  Colo-Colo
 Fabián Acuña to  Coquimbo Unido
 Gustavo Canales to  Unión Española
 Martín Gianfelice to  Club Atlético Estudiantes
 Juan Quiroga to  Coquimbo Unido
 Carlos Alzamora to  Cobresal
 Ángel Carreño to  Ñublense
 Luis Peña to  Deportivo Laferre
 Johnatan Domínguez to  Unión San Felipe
 Pedro Carrizo to  Antofagasta
 Rodrigo Brito to  Curicó Unido

Municipal Iquique
In

Out

Ñublense
In

Out

O'Higgins
In
  Jorge Rivera from  Alianza Atlético
  Albert Acevedo from  Universidad Católica
  Santiago Gentiletti from  Gimnasia y Esgrima de La Plata
  Fernando Meneses from  Colo-Colo
  Ever Cantero from  Ñublense
  Cristobal Jorquera from  Colo-Colo
  Samuel Teuber from  Provincial Osorno
  Nicolás Medina from  Gimnasia y Esgrima de La Plata
  Juan Gonzalo Lorca from  Colo-Colo
  César Taborda from  Estudiantes de La Plata
Out
  Jean Beausejour to  Club América
  Carlos Tejas to  Coquimbo Unido
  Nicolas Diez to  Unión de Santa Fe
  Nestor Bareiro to  San Luis F.C.
  Rodrigo Ramírez to  Everton
  José Aílton da Silva to  Veracruz
  Marcelo Medina to  Cobresal
  Rafael Caroca to  Colo-Colo
  Sebastián Varas to  San Luis Quillota
  José Miguel Rosales to  Cobresal
  Hans Gómez to  Cobresal
  Federico Martorell to  Thrasivoulos Filis
  Javier García to  Tiro Federal

Palestino
In
  Juan Manuel Quevedo from  Temperley
  Marcos Lovos from  Temperley
  Jorge Carrasco from  Colo-Colo
  Andrés Oroz from  Rangers de Talca
  Héctor Tapia (Free agent)
  Carlos Cancino from  Unión La Calera
  Cesar Henriquez from  Panthrakikos
  Román Cuello from  Inter Baku
  Alvaro Sarabia from  Rangers de Talca
  Igancio Parra from  Unirea Focşani
  Bruno Bianchi from  Universidad San Martín de Porres
Out
  Cristián Vilches to  Audax Italiano
  José Luis Zelaye to  Huachipato
  Nélson Saavedra to  Vitória
  Octavio Pozo to  Naval
  Rodolfo Madrid to  Unión Española
  Héctor Pericás to  Unión La Calera
  Boris Sagredo to  Colo-Colo (end of loan)
  Víctor Aquino to  Maritimo

Rangers
In
  Diego de Gregorio from  Pandurii
  Eric Pino from  Deportes Antofagasta
  Jonathan Núñez from  Curico Unido
  Juan Luis Mora from  Fernández Vial
  Carlos Espinoza from  Deportes Melipilla
  Anibal Carvallo from  Colo-Colo (on loan)
  Marco Millape from  Provincial Osorno
  Maximiliano Pérez from  Defensor Sporting
  Bastián Arce from  Colo-Colo
  Pablo Vranjicán from  Newell's Old Boys
Out
  Rodrigo Barra to  Santiago Wanderers
  Andrés Oroz to  Palestino
  Rodolfo Martin Ferrando to  Cerro
  Marcelo Lucero to  Provincial Osorno
  Gastón Cellerino to  Livorno
  Enzo Gutiérrez to  Maritimo
  Esteban Gonzalez to  Ñublense
  Juan Manuel Cavallo to  Tecnico Universitario de Ambato
  Rodrigo Pereira to  Naval

Santiago Morning
In
  Marco Rodríguez from  Provincial Osorno
  Mario Berríos from  Perak FA
  Iván Guillauma from  Cobreloa
  José Luis Cabión from  Everton
  Michael Ríos from  San Marcos de Arica
  Marco Moscoso from  San Marcos de Arica
  Fidencio Oviedo from  Sol de América
  Pedro Rivera from  Ñublense
Out
  Nestor Contreras from  Deportes Melipilla
  Miguel Catalán Released
  Héctor Santaibañez Retired
  Cristián Febre from  Coquimbo Unido
  Francisco Huaiquipán to  Deportes Antofagasta
  Fernando Manriquez to  Everton
  Eduardo Dumas to  Naval

Unión Española
In
  Braulio Leal from  Audax Italiano
  Gustavo Canales from  Deportes La Serena
  Nicolás Núñez from  Universidad Católica
  Miguel Aceval from  Huachipato
  Rodolfo Madrid from  Palestino
  Raúl Estévez from  Universidad de Chile
  David Ramírez from  Gimnasia y Esgrima de La Plata
Out
  Jose Luis Sierra Retired
  Angel Vildozo to  Unión Española
  Gerardo Cortés to  Colo-Colo (end of loan)
  Johan Fuentes to  Curico Unido
  Nicolas Canales to  Cobresal
  Nelson Lopez to  La Paz F.C.

Universidad Católica
In

Out

Universidad de Concepción
In

Out

Universidad de Chile
In

Out

Clausura 2009

Audax Italiano
In
 Cristián Canío from  San Martín de Tucumán
 Mauro Olivi from  Olimpo de Bahía Blanca
 Sebastián Pinto from  Gimnasia y Esgrima de Jujuy
 Roberval Conceicao from  San Martín de San Juan
Out
 Fabián Orellana to  Udinese Calcio
 Rubén Darío Gigena to  LDU Portoviejo
 Patricio Gutiérrez to  Curicó Unido
 Mauricio Salazar to  La Serena
 Omar Enrique Mallea to  Deportivo Maipú
 Lucas Suárez (released)
 Ricardinho Released

Cobreloa
In
 Carlos Tordoya from  Club Bolívar
 Tomás González from  2 de Mayo
 Mathias Caserio from  Central Córdoba
 Simón Ramírez Transferred from  All Boys
 Emanuel Lazzarini from  Newell's Old Boys
Out
 Charles Aránguiz to  Colo-Colo
 Paulo Magalhaes to  Colo-Colo
 Rodrigo Mannara to  Universidad Católica
 Juan Carlos Caballero to  Alicante CF
 Alonso Zúñiga to  Santiago Morning
 Jonathan Retamal to  Naval
 Lucas Gauna Released
 Leonardo Iorlano Released

Cobresal
In
 Iván Guillauma from  Santiago Morning
 Juan Cabral from  Universidad de Concepción
 Sebastián Suárez from  CA Cerro
 Michael Godoy from  Olimpia
 Claudio Calderon from  Curicó Unido
Out
 Carlos Alzamora Released
 Ronny Pérez Released
 Cristian Ríos to  Municipal Iquique

Colo-Colo
In
 Charles Aránguiz from  Cobreloa
 Paulo Magalhaes from  Cobreloa
 Esteban Paredes from  Santiago Morning
 Ezequiel Miralles from  Everton
 Cristian Bogado from  Estudiantes de La Plata (loaned)
 Diego Olate from  O'Higgins
 Jose Manuel Rey from  Caracas FC (loaned)
 Alex Von Schwedler from  Os Belenenses
Out
 Sebastián González to  AEP Paphos
 Yerson Opazo to  O'Higgins
 Luis Pedro Figueroa to  Palmeiras
 César Carranza to  Everton (on loan)
 Rodolfo Moya to  Everton (on loan)
 Boris Sagredo to  Municipal Iquique (on loan)
 Nelson Cabrera to  CFR Cluj (on loan)
 Felipe Hernández to  Puerto Montt (on loan)
 Rodrigo Riquelme to  Palestino
 Lucas Barrios to  Borussia Dortmund
 Gonzalo Jara to  West Bromwich Albion
 Daniel González to  O'Higgins (on loan)

Manager in
 Hugo Tocalli Free agent
Manager out
 Marcelo Barticciotto Released

Curicó Unido
In
 Ricardo Parada from  Antofagasta
 Jairo Neira from  Universidad de Concepción
 Sergio Valenti from  Gimnasia y Esgrima de La Plata
 Patricio Gutiérrez from  Audax Italiano
 Braulio Armoa from  Sichuan FC
 Eric Olivares from  Deportes Melipilla
 Liber Quiñones from  Racing Club de Montevideo
Out
 Pedro Muñoz to  Universidad de Concepción
 Ever Amarilla to  Puerto Montt
 Daniel Briceño to  Unión San Felipe
 Claudio Calderon to  Cobresal
 Felipe Miranda Released

Everton
In
 César Carranza from  Colo-Colo (loaned)
 Rodolfo Moya from  Colo-Colo (loaned)
 Maximiliano Pérez from  Fénix
 Sebastián Rocco from  Gimnasia y Esgrima de Jujuy
 Mauro Guevgeozián from  Fénix
 Cristián Torralbo from  Lota Schwager
Out
 Mathias Vidangossy to  Ñublense
 Ezequiel Miralles to  Colo-Colo
 Roberto Gutiérrez to  Universidad Católica
 Diego Figueredo to  Cerro Porteño
 Nicolás Peric to  Argentinos Juniors
 Oscar Roberto Cornejo to  Nueva Chicago
 Sebastián Penco to  San Martín de San Juan

Huachipato
In
Out
 Fernando Lazcano to  Deportes Concepción (loaned)

La Serena
In:
  Angel Carreño from  Ñublense
  Mauricio Salazar from  Audax Italiano
  Juan Silva from  Santiago Wanderers
  Ronald Villalba from  Deportivo Azogues
  Óscar Nadin Díaz González from  12 de Octubre
  Claudio Pérez from  Tiro Federal
  Javier Elizondo from  Deportivo Santamarina
Out
  Luis Jara Released
  Freddy Segura Retired
  Leonardo Abálsamo to  Platense

Municipal Iquique
In
 Nestor Bareiro from  Real San Luis (loaned)
 Anibal Carvallo from  Rangers
 Boris Sagredo from  Colo-Colo (loaned)
 Cristian Ríos from  Cobresal
 Isaías Peralta from  Unión Española
Out
 Edson Puch to  Universidad de Chile
 Cristian Bogado to  Estudiantes de La Plata (end of loan)
 Rafael Celedon to  San Marcos de Arica (loaned)
 Vicente Paciello to  12 de Octubre
 Arturo Villasanti to  Boca Unidos

Ñublense
In
 José Felix Pedrozo to  Antofagasta
 Joel Soto from  Santiago Wanderers
 Jorge Acuña from  Mamelodi Sundowns
 Andres Manzanares Transferred from  Quilmes
 Martin Cortés Transferred from  Defensores de Belgrano
 Mauricio Cataldo Free agent
Out
 Jorge Toledo to  Deportes Concepción
 Angel Carreño to  La Serena
 Federic Figueroa to  Deportes Valdivia
 Matías Rojas to  Lota Schwager
 Roberto Ordenes Transferred to  Unión Española
 Rodrigo Cantero Released
 Mathias Vidangossy Released

O'Higgins
In
 Yerson Opazo from  Colo-Colo
 Leonardo Saavedra from  Deportes Antofagasta
 Iván Vásquez from  Universidad Católica
 Kevin Harbottle from  Argentinos Juniors
 Jaime Grondona from  Santiago Morning
 Anibal Domeneghini from  Unión Española (on loan)
 Cristián Suárez from  Chacarita Juniors
 Alejandro Vásquez from  Universidad de Concepción
 Daniel González from  Nautico (on loan from Colo-Colo)
Out
 César Taborda to  Estudiantes de La Plata (end of loan)
 Bryan Danesi to  San Luis Quillota
 Diego Olate to  Colo-Colo

Palestino
In
 Marco Olea from  Lobos BUAP
 Luis Oyarzún (Free agent)
 Facundo Pereyra from  Estudiantes de Caseros
 Rodrigo Riquelme (footballer, born 1984) from  Colo-Colo
 Juan Saez from  Melipilla
 Luis Núñez from  Universidad Católica
 Héctor Joel Pérez from  Unión Española
Out
 Nélson Saavedra to  São Paulo FC
 Bruno Bianchi to  SD Lemona
 Román Cuello Released
 Marcos Lobos Released

Rangers
In
 Ezequiel Brítez from  Club Irapuato
 Roberto Bonet from  Quilmes AC
 Enzo Gutiérrez from  Maritimo
 Lucas Ojeda from  Club Gimnasia y Esgrima
 Iván Alvarez from  Puerto Montt
 Eduardo Dos Santos from  Club Almagro
 David Villarroel from  Fernandez Vial
Out
 Anibal Carvallo to  Municipal Iquique
 Maximiliano Perez to  Everton
 Jorge Aquino to  Deportes Naval
 Diego de Gregorio to  San Marcos de Arica
 Eduardo Picart Died

Santiago Morning
In
 Fabián Cuéllar from  Atlético Huila
 Sérgio Comba from  Defensores de Belgrano
 Rodolfo Ferrando from  Cerro
 Reinaldo Navia from  LDU Quito
 Alonso Zúñiga from  Cobreloa
 Rodolfo Beltrán from  Deportes Ovalle
 Emanuel Gonzalez from  Deportes Ovalle
 Bernardo Campos from  Universidad Católica
Out
 Iván Guillauma to  Cobresal
 Esteban Paredes to  Colo-Colo
 Jaime Grondona to  O'Higgins

Unión Española
In
 Eduardo Rubio from  FC Basel
 Matías Masiero from  CA Bella Vista
 Roberto Ordenes from  Ñublense
 Francisco Nájera from  Santa Fe
Out
 Miguel Orellana to  Provincial Osorno
 Isaías Peralta to  Municipal Iquique
 Anibal Domeneghini to  O'Higgins
 Clarence Acuña to  O'Higgins
 Héctor Joel Pérez to  Palestino (loaned)

Universidad Católica
In
 Rodrigo Mannara from  Cobreloa
 Leonel Mena from  Universidad de Concepción
 David Henríquez from  Dorados de Sinaloa (on loan)
 Roberto Gutiérrez from  Tecos (on loan)
 Damián Díaz from  Boca Juniors (on loan)
 Juan José Morales from  Quilmes AC
Out
  Luis Núñez to  Palestino
  Iván Vásquez to  O'Higgins
  Jaison Ibarrola to  Cerro Porteño
  Jeremías Caggiano to  Gimnasia y Esgrima de Jujuy
  Gilberto Palacios to  Guaraní
  Damián Luna to  São Caetano

Universidad de Concepción
In
 Pedro Muñoz  Curicó Unido
 Otelo Ocampos from  Puerto Montt
 Michael Lepe from  Naval
 Carlos Rivas Godoy from  Municipal Iquique
 Alejandro Gaete Transferred from  Unión La Calera
 Franco Valori Transferred from  Rosario Central
Out
 Jairo Neira to  Curicó Unido
 Leonel Mena to  Universidad Católica
 Juan Cabral to  Cobresal
 José Luis Jiménez to  Santiago Wanderers
 Daniel Pereira to  Chacarita Juniors

Universidad de Chile
In
 Edson Puch from  Universidad de Chile
 Nelson Pinto from  Tecos
 Mauricio Victorino from  Nacional
Out
 Sebastián Pardo Retired
 Cristián Milla to  Chacarita Juniors
 Hugo Notario to  Club Guaraní
 Emilio Hernández to  Cruz Azul
 Nelson Cuevas to  Club Olimpia
 Emmanuel Vargas to  Lota Schwager (loaned)

Transfers
2009